St. Martin Island Light is an exoskeleton lighthouse on St. Martin Island. It marks one of four passages between Lake Michigan and the bay of Green Bay. Constructed in 1905, this light tower is the only example in the US of a pure exoskeletal tower on the Great Lakes. Similar designs exist in Canada. Painted white, the hexagonal tower is made of iron plates which are supported by six exterior steel posts that have latticed buttresses.

The cream city brick lightkeeper's house was modeled after that used for the Plum Island Range Lights.

It was listed on the National Register of Historic Places on July 19, 1984, Reference #84001387 as St. Martin Light Station (U.S. Coast Guard/ Great Lakes TR). It is not on the state list/inventory. A steam fog signal was also installed. which was thereafter replaced by a diaphone.

The lighthouse keeper's dwelling has been abandoned and "is in poor condition."

The light station is closed to the public. It is managed by in partnership with the Little Traverse Bay Band of the Odawa Indian Nation.

References

External links

 
 Detroit News, Interactive map on Michigan lighthouses, which fails to list St. Martin Island Light.
 Interactive map of Lights in Northern Lake Michigan, mapped by Google.
 Map of Michigan Lighthouse in PDF Format.
 Map of lighthouses in western Lake Michigan.

Lighthouses completed in 1905
Houses completed in 1905
Michigan State Historic Sites
Lighthouses on the National Register of Historic Places in Michigan
National Register of Historic Places in Delta County, Michigan
1905 establishments in Michigan